The men's eight competition at the 1952 Summer Olympics took place at Meilahti, Finland. It was held from 20 to 23 July. There were 14 boats (126 competitors) from 14 nations, with each nation limited to a single boat in the event. The event was won by the United States, the nation's seventh consecutive and ninth overall gold medal in the men's eight; the Americans had won every time they competed (missing 1908 and 1912). The Soviet Union took silver in its Olympics debut; Australia's bronze was its first medal in the men's eight.

Background

This was the 11th appearance of the event. Rowing had been on the programme in 1896 but was cancelled due to bad weather. The men's eight has been held every time that rowing has been contested, beginning in 1900.

The United States was the dominant nation in the event, with the nation winning the previous six Olympic men's eight competitions (as well as the other two competitions which the United States had entered). Potential challengers included Australia (1950 British Empire champion) and Great Britain (1951 European Rowing Championships winners), but the Americans were heavily favored.

Finland, Romania, and the Soviet Union each made their debut in the event. Canada, Great Britain, and the United States each made their ninth appearance, tied for most among nations to that point.

Competition format

The "eight" event featured nine-person boats, with eight rowers and a coxswain. It was a sweep rowing event, with the rowers each having one oar (and thus each rowing on one side). The course returned to the 2000 metres distance that became the Olympic standard in 1912 (with the exception of 1948).

The 1952 competition featured five rounds: three main rounds (quarterfinals, semifinals, and a final) as well as two repechages, after the quarterfinals and semifinals.

 The 14 boats were divided into 3 heats of 4 or 5 boats each for the quarterfinals. The winner and 2nd place boats in each heat (6 total) advanced to the semifinals, while the remaining boats (8 total) went to the repechage.
 The first repechage had 8 boats. They were placed in 3 heats, with 2 or 3 boats each. The winner of each repechage heat (a tie in one heat led to there being a total of 4 boats advancing) went to the second repechage (not the semifinals), with the other boats (4 total) eliminated.
 The semifinals placed the 6 boats in 2 heats, with 3 boats per heat. The winner of each heat (2 boats total) advanced directly to the final, while the other boats (4 total) competed in the second repechage.
 The second repechage had 8 boats, placed in 3 heats with 2 or 3 boats per heat. The winner of each heat (3 boats) qualified for the final, with all others (5 total) eliminated.
 The final round consisted of a single final for the medals and 4th and 5th places.

Schedule

All times are Eastern European Summer Time (UTC+3)

Results

Quarterfinals

Quarterfinal 1

Quarterfinal 2

Quarterfinal 3

First repechage

First repechage heat 1

First repechage heat 2

First repechage heat 3

The finish between these two boats was so close that even the photo finish could not separate them. Both boats advanced.

Semifinals

Semifinal 1

Semifinal 2

Second repechage

Second repechage heat 1

Second repechage heat 2

Second repechage heat 3

Final

Results summary

The following rowers took part:

References

External links

Rowing at the 1952 Summer Olympics